My Sisters' Keeper is a 1970 novel by the British writer L.P. Hartley.

References

Bibliography
  Wright, Adrian. Foreign Country: The Life of L.P. Hartley. I. B. Tauris, 2001.

1970 British novels
Novels by L. P. Hartley
Hamish Hamilton books